John M. Spalding (often misspelled Spaulding in official Army reports) (December 17, 1914 – November 6, 1959) was an officer in the U.S. 1st Infantry Division during World War II.

Biography
Spalding was a native of Owensboro, Kentucky.  He is famous as one of the first officers (a lieutenant at the time for E Company, 2nd Battalion, 16th Infantry) to make it up to the top of bloody Omaha Beach and clear out German defenses from behind.  He and his men, including his sergeant, Philip Streczyk, helped make the breakthrough there on D-Day possible.  His platoon landed on the Easy Red sector, and made it to the seawall largely intact, unlike most in the first wave.  Instead of attacking up the beach exits, as was planned, he instead helped find and clear a path up the mined bluffs, right of Exit E-1.  Once at the top, his team was the first to attack the enemy fortifications from the rear, clearing out trenches and pillboxes along Exit E-1.  Later on D-Day he was involved in actions further inland at Colleville-sur-Mer. For his actions on D-Day, he was later awarded the Distinguished Service Cross. After the war, he returned there and served in the Kentucky House of Representatives as a Democrat.

References

D-Day June 6, 1944: The Climactic Battle of World War II, Stephen Ambrose, Simon & Schuster, 1994,

External links
Cross-Channel Attack a publication of the United States Army Center of Military History
Omaha Beachhead a publication of the United States Army Center of Military History
Spalding's Interview from warchronicle.com

1959 deaths
United States Army personnel of World War II
Democratic Party members of the Kentucky House of Representatives
Military personnel from Kentucky
People from Owensboro, Kentucky
Recipients of the Distinguished Service Cross (United States)
United States Army officers
1914 births
20th-century American politicians